"Bandido" is a song by Puerto Rican rappers and singers Myke Towers and Juhn. It was released on December 10, 2020 through White World Music. The song belongs to the Myke Towers EP called Para Mi Ex. The song became world top in several lists of Latin American countries. Also it got to position itself in the US Billboard Hot 100 chart and the top positions on the US Hot Latin Songs chart.

Background and release
Michael Anthony Torres Monge better known as Myke Towers released his EP entitled Para Mi Ex which included the song "Bandido" in collaboration with the Puerto Rican singer Juhn. The song talks about a boy who wants to defend his beloved from his boyfriend who mistreats her and does not value her. "Bandido", like the aforementioned hit, is an ode to women, as it shows a version of Towers who would do anything to make sure that his protagonist feels loved. In the song, he weaves a story about a woman who finds herself in a loveless relationship with someone who doesn't know how to truly value her and how Towers would do anything to remind him of her true beauty.

Charts

Weekly charts

Year-end charts

Certifications

See also
List of Billboard number-one Latin songs of 2021

References

2020 singles
2020 songs
Reggaeton songs
Argentina Hot 100 number-one singles
Number-one singles in Spain
Myke Towers songs